Gunilla Jonsson and Michael Petersén are Swedish writers and designers of role-playing games. They wrote the Mutant and KULT games while working for Äventyrsspel (Target Games) in the 1980s. They helmed their own game company, Ragnarök Speldesign, for a few years in the late 1980s.

Personal life 
Jonsson and Petersén ended up in the same group of role-players in 1981. They are married, and both work at the SF-Bokhandeln bookstore in Stockholm. They write for Perilous Worlds.

Awards 
 Rollspelsdraken 2012
 The ESFS Chrysalis Awards (Sweden) 2019

Works 
 Mutant (rpg, 1984, Äventyrsspel)
 KULT (rpg, 1991, Äventyrsspel)
 Mörkrets Legioner, Den Svarta Madonnan, Fallna Änglar, Tarotikum
 Writing credits on games Sagan om Ringen (Swedish translation of MERP) and Western Rollspelet
 several scenarios for Drakar och Demoner, Chock (Swedish translation of Chill) and Mutant (1984 and 1991 versions), including Spökgeneralen and Uppdrag i Mos Mosel
 En Garde! (rpg, 1987, Ragnarök Speldesign)
 Skuggornas Mästare (rpg, 1988, Ragnarök Speldesign)
 Döden är bara början and De levande döda (novels, 2018/2020, Free League Publishing)

References 
 Review of "Mot andra världar" (Towards other worlds) (in Swedish), a Swedish-language documentary of the Swedish TTRPG scene featuring Jonsson and Petersén discussing their creation of KULT and the moral panic surrounding the game

Role-playing game designers
Year of birth missing (living people)
Swedish game designers